Brahm Singh Tanwar (born on 7 July 1952 in Delhi) is a member of Bharatiya Janata Party and  a former member of the Delhi Legislative Assembly. He was elected to the assembly in 1993, 1998 from Mehrauli and 2013 from Chattarpur. He is a three time Councillor and three time MLA from the Outer Delhi. He is a mass leader of Gurjar community in Delhi. He was also listed as Top 5 Richest Candidate of 2020 Delhi Legislative Assembly election.

References

Delhi MLAs 2013–2015
Living people
1952 births
People from Delhi
Bharatiya Janata Party politicians from Delhi